Revealing may refer to:

 Revelation - in religion, the revealing of things to come
 Book of Revelation - the Biblical book on revelation
 Revealing (album) - James Blood Ulmer album